The Philadelphia Ramblers  were a minor professional ice hockey team based in the Philadelphia Arena in Philadelphia, Pennsylvania. The Ramblers played for nine seasons in the Eastern Hockey League from 1955 to 1964. After the end of the 1963-64 season, the team relocated to Cherry Hill, New Jersey and were renamed the Jersey Devils (not to be confused with the NHL team).

Former members of the EHL Ramblers included Ted Harris (1956–58), future Toronto Maple Leafs coach John Brophy and goalie Ross Brooks who was one of the oldest rookies in the NHL playing for the Boston Bruins in the early 1970s. Doug Adam both played and coached for the Ramblers.

Previously, another Philadelphia Ramblers team played in the American Hockey League from 1935 to 1941.

Season-by-season results

References

External links
Ramblers entry in A-Z Encyclopedia of Ice Hockey
Ramblers history
"A Brief History of The American Hockey League & Minor League Pro Hockey in Philadelphia: 1927 - 2005"

Defunct ice hockey teams in Pennsylvania
Defunct sports teams in Philadelphia
Eastern Hockey League teams
Ice hockey clubs established in 1955
Ice hockey clubs disestablished in 1964
1955 establishments in Pennsylvania
1964 establishments in Pennsylvania